Hans Smit (August 13, 1927 – January 7, 2012) was the Stanley H. Fuld Professor Emeritus of Law at Columbia Law School.

Biography 
Smit was born in Amsterdam and earned his LL.B. in 1946 and his J.D. in 1949 from the University of Amsterdam. He worked in private practice in The Hague before moving to New York City on a Fulbright scholarship, where he earned a master's degree at Columbia in 1953 and graduated first in his class with an LL.B. from Columbia Law School in 1958.

Smit worked for Sullivan & Cromwell for two years before joining the Columbia Law School faculty in 1960 as director of the Project on International Procedure. His students included future Supreme Court justice Ruth Bader Ginsburg, who served as a research associate and associate director of the program. He was credited for helping to revise section 1782 of Title 28 of the United States Code.

Smit also founded the Columbia-Leiden-Amsterdam Summer Program, which gave law students the opportunity to travel to the Netherlands for one month of intensive training in American law. He was an expert on European and international law and co-edited The Law of the European Economic Community with Peter E. Herzog. In 1978, Smit was appointed to the Stanley H. Fuld Chair at Columbia Law School.

He was a member of the Royal Netherlands Academy of Arts and Sciences. In 1987, he was made a Knight of the Order of the Netherlands Lion by Queen Beatrix.

Personal life 
Smit was the longtime owner of the Schinasi Mansion, the only freestanding single-family mansion in Manhattan. He died on January 7, 2012 at the age of 84.

Smit was a water polo player who played for New York Athletic Club.

References 

1927 births
2012 deaths
Columbia Law School faculty
Sullivan & Cromwell people
Columbia Law School alumni
Lawyers from Amsterdam
University of Amsterdam alumni
Members of the Royal Netherlands Academy of Arts and Sciences
Recipients of the Order of the Netherlands Lion